The 18th Vuelta a España (Tour of Spain), a long-distance bicycle stage race and one of the three grand tours, was held from 1 May to 15 May 1963. Not only did Anquetil complete his Grand Tour treble, this also marked the first time in history a rider won two Grand Tours in the same calendar year for his team sponsor (since most Grand Tours from the 1930s until the early 1960s were contested in national teams). Bas Maliepaard won the points classification and Julio Jiménez won the mountains classification.

Teams and riders

Route

Results

References

External links
La Vuelta (Official site in Spanish, English, and French)

 
1963 in road cycling
1963
1963 in Spanish sport
1963 Super Prestige Pernod